Ballentine
 Barraud Park
 Bayview
 Berkley                                            
 Broad Creek/Bowling Green/Roberts Village                                            
 Calvert Square
 Chesterfield Heights
 Colonial Place
 Coleman Place
 Cottage Road Park
 Crown Point
 Diggs Park
 Downtown Norfolk
 East Ocean View
 Elizabeth Park
 Estabrook
 Fairmount Park Neighborhood
 Fort Norfolk
 Freemason District
 Ghent
Highland Park
 Huntersville, also called Hunters Village or Olde Huntersville
 Ingleside
 Kensington
 Larchmont-Edgewater
 Lafayette / Winona
 Lafayette Shores
 Lakewood
 Lamberts Point
 Larrymore Lawns
 Lindenwood
 Lochhaven
 Meadowbrook
 North Ghent
 Northside
 Norview
 Ocean View
 Park Place
 Pinewell
 Poplar Halls
 Riverpoint
 Riverview
 Sewell's Point
 Sewell's Garden
 Shoop Park
 South Bayview
 Talbot Park
 Tidewater Park 
 Titustown
 Villa Heights
 Wards Corner Business District
 West Freemason
 West Ocean View
 Willoughby Spit
 Young Terrace
Historic Districts in Norfolk

Many of Norfolk's neighborhoods, buildings, and landmarks have notable national and local historic significance. The city has four Locally Designated Historic Districts, Ghent, Downtown, West Freemason, East Freemason, and Hodges House (consisting of a single structure). Norfolk also has fifteen districts recognized on the National Register of Historic Places.

References

External links
 Norfolk Neighborhood Profiles
 Norfolk Neighborhood Service Areas
 Interactive GIS Map of Norfolk